Lalit Chandra Rajkhowa was an Indian politician from Assam, India. He was a Member of Assam Legislative Assembly for Teok, elected in 1985. He was married to the current Member of Assam Legislative Assembly for Teok, Renupoma Rajkhowa.

References 

Assam MLAs 1985–1991
Indian politicians